Nature Gone Wild is an American reality television series. The series premiered on A&E on January 6, 2021. In the series, explorer Greg Aiello takes a closer look at extreme sides of nature, such as natural disasters and animal encounters.

References

External links 
 

2020s American reality television series
2021 American television series debuts
English-language television shows
A&E (TV network) original programming
Works about natural disasters
Media about animal attacks